Brest is a village in Treklyano Municipality, Kyustendil Province, south-western Bulgaria. In 2011, the village had only one inhabitant who was eighty-three years old, down from two inhabitants in 2008 and further down from 97 people in 1956. It is most likely a ghost village, with no population.

References

Villages in Kyustendil Province